Stéphane Roy (born 26 January 1976) is a Canadian former professional ice hockey centre.

Career
Roy was born in Sainte-Martine, Quebec. He played junior hockey in the Quebec Major Junior Hockey League for the Val-d'Or Foreurs from 1993 to 1996.

Career 
Roy was drafted 68th overall by the St. Louis Blues in the 1994 NHL Entry Draft and played three seasons in the American Hockey League (AHL) for the Worcester IceCats, the Blues' affiliate, as well as one season with the Quebec Citadelles.

Roy moved to Europe in 2000, beginning in the United Kingdom's Ice Hockey Superleague with the Bracknell Bees. He then spent a season in Italy's Serie A for HC Alleghe before moving to Switzerland's National League B where he spent eleven seasons, four with EHC Visp and seven with HC Ajoie.

Career statistics

External links

1976 births
Living people
HC Ajoie players
HC Alleghe players
Bracknell Bees players
Canadian ice hockey centres
HC Fribourg-Gottéron players
Ice hockey people from Quebec
SC Langnau players
People from Montérégie
Quebec Citadelles players
Sorel Éperviers players
St. Louis Blues draft picks
Val-d'Or Foreurs players
EHC Visp players
EC VSV players
Worcester IceCats players
Canadian expatriate ice hockey players in Switzerland